Walworth County is a county located in the U.S. state of Wisconsin. As of the 2020 census, the population was 106,478. Its county seat is Elkhorn. The county was created in 1836 from Wisconsin Territory and organized in 1839. It is named for Reuben H. Walworth. Walworth County comprises the Whitewater-Elkhorn, WI Micropolitan Statistical Area and is included in the Milwaukee-Racine-Waukesha, WI Combined Statistical Area. Lake Geneva, the University of Wisconsin-Whitewater, and Alpine Valley Resort, and Music Theatre are located in Walworth County.

Geography

Transportation

Major highways

  Interstate 43
  U.S. Highway 12
  U.S. Highway 14
  Highway 11 (Wisconsin)
  Highway 20 (Wisconsin)
  Highway 36 (Wisconsin)
  Highway 50 (Wisconsin)
  Highway 59 (Wisconsin)
  Highway 67 (Wisconsin)
  Highway 83 (Wisconsin)
  Highway 89 (Wisconsin)
  Highway 120 (Wisconsin)

Railroads
Canadian National
East Troy Electric Railroad
Union Pacific
Wisconsin and Southern Railroad

Buses
List of intercity bus stops in Wisconsin

Airport
East Troy Municipal Airport , serves the county and surrounding communities

Adjacent counties
 Waukesha County  (northeast)
 Racine County  (east)
 Kenosha County  (east)
 McHenry County, Illinois (southeast)
 Boone County, Illinois (southwest)
 Rock County  (west)
 Jefferson County  (northwest)

Demographics

2020 census
As of the census of 2020, the population was 106,478. The racial makeup of the county was 85.4% White, 1.1% Black or African American, 1.0% Asian, 0.4% Native American, 4.6% from other races, and 7.4% from two or more races. Ethnically, the population was 11.8% Hispanic or Latino of any race.

2000 census
At the 2000 census there were 93,759 people, 34,522 households, and 23,267 families in the county. The population density was 169 people per square mile (65/km2). There were 43,783 housing units at an average density of 79 per square mile (30/km2).  The racial makeup of the county was 94.49% White, 0.84% Black or African American, 0.23% Native American, 0.65% Asian, 0.03% Pacific Islander, 2.62% from other races, and 1.14% from two or more races. 6.54% of the population were Hispanic or Latino of any race.
Of the 34,522 households 31.80% had children under the age of 18 living with them, 55.40% were married couples living together, 8.20% had a female householder with no husband present, and 32.60% were non-families. 24.70% of households were one person and 9.20% were one person aged 65 or older. The average household size was 2.57 and the average family size was 3.07.

The age distribution was 24.20% under the age of 18, 13.80% from 18 to 24, 27.60% from 25 to 44, 21.80% from 45 to 64, and 12.70% 65 or older. The median age was 35 years. For every 100 females there were 98.90 males. For every 100 females age 18 and over, there were 97.20 males.

In 2017, there were 918 births, giving a general fertility rate of 48.8 births per 1000 women aged 15–44, the sixth lowest rate out of all 72 Wisconsin counties.

Communities

Cities
 Burlington (mostly in Racine County)
 Delavan
 Elkhorn (county seat)
 Lake Geneva
 Whitewater (partly in Jefferson County)

Villages

 Bloomfield
 Darien
 East Troy
 Fontana-on-Geneva Lake
 Genoa City (partly in Kenosha County)
 Mukwonago (mostly in Waukesha County)
 Sharon
 Walworth
 Williams Bay

Towns

 Bloomfield
 Darien
 Delavan
 East Troy
 Geneva
 Lafayette
 La Grange
 Linn
 Lyons
 Richmond
 Sharon
 Spring Prairie
 Sugar Creek
 Troy
 Walworth
 Whitewater

Census-designated places
 Allen's Grove
 Como
 Delavan Lake
 Lake Ivanhoe
 Lake Lorraine
 Lauderdale Lakes
 Lyons
 Potter Lake
 Springfield
 Turtle Lake

Unincorporated communities

 Abells Corners
 Adams
 Bardwell
 Big Foot Prairie (partial)
 Bowers
 East Delavan
 Fairfield (partial)
 Inlet
 Heart Prairie
 Hilburn
 Honey Creek (partial)
 Honey Lake (partial)
 La Grange
 Lake Beulah
 Lake Como
 Lake Lawn
 Lauderdale
 Lauderdale Shores
 Linton
 Little Prairie
 Millard
 North Bloomfield
 Pell Lake
 Powers Lake
 Richmond
 Spring Prairie
 Tibbets
 Troy
 Troy Center
 Voree
 Zenda

Ghost towns
 Army Lake
 Mayhews

Politics
Owing to its Yankee heritage, which contrasts with the German-American or Scandinavian-American character of most of Wisconsin, Walworth County was initially a stronghold of the Free Soil Party. It voted for Martin van Buren and John P. Hale in Wisconsin's first two presidential elections, and its opposition to the spread of slavery meant it became Republican in subsequent elections, even resisting the appeal of Wisconsin native Robert La Follette when he carried the state in 1924.

Walworth County remains strongly Republican. The only Democrat to carry the county was Woodrow Wilson in 1912, who won 36 percent of the vote. Even with the GOP mortally divided between President William Howard Taft and Theodore Roosevelt, Wilson only won the county by 29 votes. The best Democratic showings since then have been by Lyndon Johnson in 1964 and Barack Obama in 2008, both of whom received around 48 percent. Franklin D. Roosevelt and Bill Clinton are the only other Democrats since Wilson to cross the 40 percent mark, though Joe Biden came very close in 2020.

Education
School districts include:

K-12:

 Burlington Area School District
 Clinton Community School District
 Delavan-Darien School District
 East Troy Community School District
 Elkhorn Area School District
 Mukwonago School District
 Palmyra-Eagle Area School District
 Whitewater School District
 Williams Bay School District

Secondary:
 Big Foot Union High School District
 Lake Geneva-Genoa City Union High School District

Elementary:

 Fontana Joint No. 8 School District
 Geneva Joint No. 4 School District
 Genoa City Joint No. 2 School District
 Lake Geneva Joint No. 1 School District
 Linn Joint No. 4 School District
 Linn Joint No. 6 School District
 Sharon Joint No. 11 School District
 Walworth Joint No. 1 School District

Wisconsin School for the Deaf, a state-operated school, is in the county.

See also
 National Register of Historic Places listings in Walworth County, Wisconsin
 Walworth County Fairgrounds

References

Further reading
 History of Walworth County, Wisconsin. Chicago: Western Historical Company, 1882.

External links
 Walworth County
 Walworth County map from the Wisconsin Department of Transportation
 Travel Guide for Lake Geneva and Walworth County, WI
 Combination Atlas Map, 1873

 
1839 establishments in Wisconsin Territory
Populated places established in 1839